The family Scarabaeidae, as currently defined, consists of over 30,000 species of beetles worldwide; they are often called scarabs or scarab beetles. The classification of this family has undergone significant change in recent years. Several subfamilies have been elevated to family rank (e.g., Bolboceratidae, Geotrupidae, Glaresidae, Glaphyridae, Hybosoridae, Ochodaeidae, and Pleocomidae), and some reduced to lower ranks. The subfamilies listed in this article are in accordance with those in Bouchard (2011).

Description 

Scarabs are stout-bodied beetles, many with bright metallic colours, measuring between 	. They have distinctive, clubbed antennae composed of plates called lamellae that can be compressed into a ball or fanned out like leaves to sense odours. Many species are fossorial, with legs adapted for digging. In some groups males (and sometimes females) have prominent horns on the head and/or pronotum to fight over mates or resources.

The C-shaped larvae, called grubs, are pale yellow or white. Most adult beetles are nocturnal, although the flower chafers (Cetoniinae) and many leaf chafers (Rutelinae) are active during the day. The grubs mostly live underground or under debris, so are not exposed to sunlight. Many scarabs are scavengers that recycle dung, carrion, or decaying plant material. Others, such as the Japanese beetle, are plant-eaters.

Some of the well-known beetles from the Scarabaeidae are Japanese beetles, dung beetles, June beetles, rose chafers (Australian, European, and North American), rhinoceros beetles, Hercules beetles and Goliath beetles.

Several members of this family have structurally coloured shells which act as left-handed circular polarisers; this was the first-discovered example of circular polarization in nature.

Ancient Egypt 
In Ancient Egypt, the dung beetle now known as Scarabaeus sacer (formerly Ateuchus sacer) was revered as sacred. Egyptian amulets representing the sacred scarab beetles were traded throughout the Mediterranean world.

See also 
 List of Scarabaeidae genera
 Scarab artifact
 Dung beetle – Scarabaeidae dung beetles play an important role in temperate and tropical environments

References

Further reading 

 RU Ehlers. Current and Future Use of Nematodes in Biocontrol: Practice and Commercial Aspects with Regard to Regulatory Policy Issues.  Biocontrol Science and Technology Volume 6, Issue 3, 1996.

External links 

 Flickr Images on Flickr
 Scarabaeidae breeding site Photos of various Cetonidae, Dynastidae, Euchiridae, Lucanidae and Trichinae]
 Family SCARABAEIDAE
 June Beetles, Family: Scarabaeidae - Diagnostic photographs
 Scarab Beetle Research, Databases, and Links from Scarab Central at University of Nebraska State Museum
 Bibliography of literature published on scarab beetles since 1 January 2001 (worldwide coverage; through 2005)
 UNL Generic Guide to New World Scarabaeidae
 
 

 
Beetle families
Taxa named by Pierre André Latreille